Rokytne can refer to several places in Ukraine:
 Rokytne, Kyiv Oblast, an urban-type settlement in Kyiv Oblast
 Rokytne, Rivne Oblast, an urban-type settlement in Rivne Oblast
 Rokytne, Chernivtsi Oblast, a village in Chernivtsi Oblast

Rokytne Raion may refer to:

Rokytne Raion, Kyiv Oblast, Ukraine
Rokytne Raion, Rivne Oblast, Ukraine

See also
 Rokitno (disambiguation)